Prinsep Ghat railway station is a Kolkata Suburban Railway station adjacent to James Prinsep Memorial in Kolkata, West Bengal, India. Only a few local trains halt here. The station has two platforms. Its station code is PPGT.

Station complex
The platform is not very well sheltered. The station lacks many facilities including water and sanitation. It is well connected to the Strand Road. There is a proper approach road to this station.

Station layout

Connections

Bus

Ferry 
The station is adjacent to Prisnep ghat. One can easily avail ferry services from there.

Airport 
Netaji Subhash Chandra Bose International Airport is 23.6 km from the station via Strand Road, Acharya Jagdish Chandra Bose Road, Maa Flyover, EM Bypass and VIP Road.

See also

References

External links
 

Sealdah railway division
Railway stations in Kolkata
Transport in Kolkata
Kolkata Suburban Railway stations
Kolkata Circular Railway